The 2011 Asian Shotgun Championships were held in Kuala Lumpur, Malaysia between November 21 and December 1, 2011.

Medal summary

Men

Women

Medal table

References

 Complete Results

External links
 Asian Shooting Federation
 ISSF Results Overview

Asian Shotgun Championships
Asian Shotgun Championships
Asian Shooting Championships
Asian Shotgun Championships
Sports competitions in Kuala Lumpur